Tracton GAA is a Gaelic Athletic Association club based in the parish of Tracton in Cork, Republic of Ireland. The club is a member of the Carrigdhoun division of Cork GAA. The club fields teams in both Gaelic football and hurling, though it has won most success in hurling. The club's pitch is in the village of Minane Bridge.

History
The club was founded in 1888, only 4 years after the foundation of the Gaelic Athletic Association.

The pitch located at Ahane in Minane Bridge has been Tracton's permanent home since 1973. Dressing rooms were erected and a clubhouse consisting of a concert hall and meeting rooms was completed in 1978. Further developments included the development of a new pitch to the west of the clubhouse in 2001, development of a ball alley in 2005 and the laying of a sand-based pitch in 2010.

Honours
 Cork Intermediate Hurling Championship (1): 1991 (Runners-up 1990)
 Cork Premier Intermediate Hurling Championship (0): (Runners-Up 2010)
 Cork Junior Hurling Championship (2): 1957, 1979
 Cork Premier Junior Hurling Championship(0): (Runners-up 2022)
 Cork Minor Hurling Championship (1): 1930
 Cork Minor C Hurling Championship (1): 2012 (Runners-Up 2022)
 Cork Under-21 Hurling Championship(0): (Runners-up 1984)
 Carrigdhoun Junior Hurling Championship (6): 1929, 1942, 1950, 1957, 1979, 1987
 Carrigdhoun Junior Football Championship (3): 1983, 2007, 2010  (Runners-Up 1932, 1939, 1943, 1967, 1969, 1999, 2004, 2006, 2009, 2012)
 South-East Under 21 "A" Hurling Championship Winners (4) 1968, 1969, 1978, 1984
 South-East Under 21 "B" Hurling Championship Winners (5) 2012, 2013, 2014, 2016, 2017

Notable players
 Terry Kelly
 Kieran Kingston
 Tom Kingston
 Michael O'Sullivan
 Shane Brick

References

External links
 

Gaelic games clubs in County Cork
Gaelic football clubs in County Cork
Hurling clubs in County Cork